Márcio Gleyson Leite da Silva (born 10 February 2001), known as Márcio Silva, is a Brazilian professional footballer who plays as a central defender for Coritiba.

Honours
Coritiba
Campeonato Paranaense: 2022

References

External links

2001 births
Living people
People from Paraíba
Brazilian footballers
Association football defenders
Coritiba Foot Ball Club players
Campeonato Brasileiro Série A players